Babylon is a village in Suffolk County, New York. The population was 12,166 at the 2010 census.

Its official name is The Incorporated Village of Babylon. It is commonly referred to as Babylon Village, to distinguish it from the Town of Babylon, of which it is a part.

History 
What is now Babylon Town and Village was originally part of Huntington Town and known as Huntington South. Lightly settled from 1689, its main industry, in common with much of the area along Great South Bay and South Oyster Bay (both actually lagoons), was the harvesting of salt hay, which was used as cattle feed and bedding.

When a coherent community grew up in the area by 1803, prominent local citizens sought to adopt a new name. An influential local lady, Mrs. Conklin, was used to living inland in what is now considered Dix Hills and was at unease with the home site that her grandchildren would be raised in. The bible-reading Mrs. Conklin compared the new hamlet to the biblical city of Babylon and proposed that name in apparent defiance of the area's rather bawdy reputation as a stop-over place for travelers on Long Island's south shore. Her son Nat was appalled by the use of an "unholy" name. The family legend states she replied: "But it will be a new Babylon." The name stuck, despite some effort to change it. The adjacent part of Islip town, an effective extension of Babylon, was originally considered as part of Babylon, or as East Babylon, but today is the hamlet of West Islip.

Revolutionary War through the War of 1812
Babylon had already been settled, as Huntington South, prior to hostilities with the British in the Revolutionary War. The First Presbyterian Church of Islip and Huntington South, as it was then known, was established in 1730. Though the church would later be split into two separate Huntington South and Islip churches in 1857 (the former to be renamed the First Presbyterian Church of Babylon after 1872). However, long before this split, the First Presbyterian Church held services in the original wooden church until 1778 when British soldiers tore down the structure. The wood from the first church was taken west to Hempstead to construct a barracks for British troops. This event was more recent history when, on the eve of the War of 1812, Joshua Hartt gave an impassioned sermon encouraging the young men to defend the United States and prepare for a "righteous war."

Babylon supplied several heroes of the Revolutionary war and War of 1812, some of whom, like continental soldier David Smith who served under George Washington, are buried in the old Babylon Cemetery. Perhaps most prominent was Joel Cook, a veteran of both wars. Citizens of Babylon first honored Captain Joel Cook with a monument unveiled in 1908. Captain Cook served throughout the duration of the Revolutionary War and commanded a Company in the War of 1812. Other prominent veterans of the War of 1812 include members of the Sammis and Cooper families. Both of these families are remembered by street names in the Village today.

In July 1814, survivors of the Battle of Valparaiso were led by Captain David Porter through the Fire Island Inlet (which would have been a very difficult task using simply oars) and up to Babylon via Sumpawams Creek. Villagers were shocked to see armed sailors heading into town, and it took time to convince some of the more prominent citizens that Captain Porter was not a British agent. To convince Stephen B. Nichols, Captain Porter even offered him his cutlass and proposed to surrender to him if Nichols truly felt he was the enemy. Once thoroughly convinced of his commission as a US naval officer, villagers provided Captain Porter and his men with a carriage and horses to take them to the Brooklyn Naval Yard. It was there that Captain Porter first shared the news of the fight at Valparaiso, over four months after the engagement.

Hotels; gateway to Fire Island
Babylon soon became the primary gateway to the nearby barrier beaches, including Fire Island, a position it held until the building of the current Captree Causeways allowing automobile access to the beaches nearest the Babylon shore. Beachgoers arriving by train or coach, or staying at local hotels typically took the Babylon Railroad, originally a horsecar line and later a trolley, to the Babylon Dock for ferries to Oak Island, Muncie Island, and Fire Island destinations.

As now, the epitome of the luxury lifestyle was summering on the ocean. This led many affluent individuals and families to reside at Babylon's seaside resorts, both on the mainland and on barrier beach islands. Muncie Island, (was just north of Oak Beach, island was depleted for the construction of Ocean Parkway) was host to one of the most elite sanatoriums and nearby Saltaire was host to the Surf Hotel offering several hundred rooms to guests. Guests of the Surf would take the rail road to Babylon's trolley and then cross the bay by a ferry. Off Robins Avenue at Stone Dock was the South Shore Inn and Watson House on Fire Island Avenue was famed to be "L.I.'s most luxurious hotel" when it was built. Those of even greater wealth would have homes or compounds built on the shore or barrier beach islands for vacationing. Stage stop hotels include the La Grange Inn, previously used as a catering hall, and now a West Islip Historical Museum, and is actually adjacent West Islip.

Some of Babylon's hotels included:
 American Hotel, Main Street and Fire Island Avenue
 The Argyle, Argyle Park, Main Street
 Boynes Hotel, at steamboat dock
 East End Hotel, Main Street and Cooper Street (burned in 1982)
 La Grange Inn, South Country Road, (West Islip), ***NOW CLOSED***
 St. James West Main Street
 Sherman House, East Main Street
 South Shore Inn, Robbins Avenue
 Surf Hotel, Fire Island, east of the lighthouse
 Watson House, Fire Island Avenue

Argyle Hotel & Park

The famous Argyle Hotel in Babylon was one of many built in the late 19th century to accommodate wealthy summer visitors from New York City. It was constructed in 1882 by August Belmont, the LIRR and resort entrepreneur on the former estate of Brooklyn railroad magnate Electus B. Litchfield. Financing was provided by a syndicate headed by Long Island Rail Road President, Austin Corbin. The grounds, which included a large millpond, Blythebourne Lake became renamed Argyle Lake, for one of the hotel's largest investors and town aristocrat, the heir to the Dukedom of Argyll. The renaming gave the Hotel & Park a more genteel English flavor yet the hotel proved a bad venture: it was near the end of the era of such projects, it was built much too large with 350 rooms, and so was rarely more than one-third filled. After about a decade of disuse, it was finally demolished in 1904, with some of the material from the structure being used to build homes west of the lake in the neighborhood now known as Argyle Park. In 1921, the land that is now the Argyle Park was donated for passive recreation to the Village of Babylon, by J. Stanley Foster, Esq.  This park is still popular, drawing substantial numbers of visitors from outside the community for fishing, strolling, playing on the children's playground, and winter ice skating (including a lighted area for night skating).

Effingham Park/Hawley's Lake Park

Effingham Park was the site of the Old Mill on what is now the Babylon Village-West Islip border and South Country Road, now Montauk Highway (Main Street in Babylon). The old mill is claimed to be the first permanent structure in the Village area and was constructed for Judge Garrett Montfort and operated by the Oakley family for approximately 100 years. Nathaniel Conklin also owned the mill and in its final years, ownership was in the hands of David Ricketts, the second mayor of the Village. Ricketts used the mill as a toy whip factory which he later relocated to George Street. At one point, a bridge was used to carry Main Street over the overflows connection to Sumpwams Creek.

The park belonged to the estate of Effingham Sutton that later came into the ownership of Edwin Hawley, a U.S. railroad tycoon. Hawley demolished the Old Mill and parts of Sutton's Estate to erect an even more opulent estate including guest cottages, staff housing, and stables. Hawley  turned the overflow from the Old Mill into a waterfall that matched and, some claim, exceeded the splendor of the still-existent Argyle Falls at Argyle Memorial Park. In addition to the falls, there were two bridges crossing the north side and mid-northeast side of the lake in many old postcards and photographs. The north side bridge was likely the bridge that carried George Street over the stream feeding Hawley's Pond, before New York Highway 231 was put through the area.

The Hawley Estate was gated off from the public with hedges and grand ornate estate fencing so that the public rarely saw its vast luxuries and amenities. In the late 1960s the site of Hawley's Pond was in a rundown state, being unkempt and dilapidated. When Route 231 was being built, Hawley's Lake Park lost all hope of being repaired and restored to its former glory: the routes northern and southern terminus were run directly through the estate. Some sources even claim that the lake was made considerably smaller and was partially filled in during the expressway's construction. Today, Hawley's Lake Park is an unused resource due mostly for its lack of parking and lack of village concern. The aging grand falls were replaced with a more modern, less ornate and less attractive setup. The Babylon Beautification Society tries from time to time to maintain the site, although no plan has proved considerably successful. Since there is no parking at the site, and because access to families that might otherwise want to use it is constrained by the necessity of crossing active highway lanes, the current status of the site has remained unchanged. Between the park and the Lake Drives in West Islip and the northern terminus of Route 231 is a small group of ponds also belonging to the former Effingham Park. This portion is no longer designated as park property, and is accessible to the homes on Lake Drive South and Lake Drive North. The overflow pool from Hawley's Fall opens into two tunnels beneath Main Street that drain into Sumpawams River, known locally as East Creek, and eventually into Great South Bay.

Baseball and African-American history

Many of the black service personnel of the Argyle Hotel formed a baseball team, the Babylon Black Panthers, said to be the first black professional baseball team. The team so dominated local white teams that Walter Cook, a New Jersey promoter, put up the money to have them travel and play as the "Cuban Giants." Calling black ballplayers (or ballplayers in "white" professional clubs in that era who seemed too dark to be Caucasian) "Cuban" was a common practice through World War II. There were no Cubans in the Cuban Giants.

The team went on to become the "world colored champions" of 1887 and 1888, and spawned imitators.

Babylon Village today has three baseball fields for the high school, little league and adult play, and the high school team is named the Babylon Panthers. The Babylon Panthers varsity baseball team won Long Island championships in 2005-2006, 2012, and the New York State championship in 2007. The village also has one of Long Island's older continuous African-American communities, of which the employees of the Argyle are said to have formed the core. This community still maintains two of the village's 12 churches, the Ebenezer Baptist Church and the Bethel African Methodist Episcopal Church, both on Cooper Street.

Another prominent African-American, the film actress Thelma (Butterfly) McQueen, moved with her family from her birthplace of Tampa, Florida to live on Cottage Row in Babylon, where she went on to graduate from Babylon High School and then pursued her acting career before later attending several universities and attaining a degree in political science. Cottage Row still exists but no longer has any housing on it, falling prey to parking space for business district stores.

Hurricane Sandy
Many Babylon village residences and businesses suffered major flood and wind damage from Hurricane Sandy on October 29, 2012 with most of the damage occurring south of Montauk Highway (Main Street) close to the Great South Bay. This particular area experienced storm surge as high as twelve feet during the storm. Damage caused by Sandy displaced dozens of families in Babylon for several months.

Description

Babylon today is part suburban bedroom community, part small-town, and has a substantial shopping and business district.

Today the village is best known for its restaurants and shops, and hosts shopping events during the fall as well as a popular crafts fair.

The non-profit James Street Players theatre group is one of the earliest on Long Island. Known best for bringing affordable live theater to Babylon Village since 1967.

A statue of Robert Moses was erected in front of the Village Hall on Main Street (Montauk Highway) in 2003.

Housing stock and neighborhoods

The commercial and housing stock in Babylon reflects its longevity as a community. Because of the 140-year presence of the railroad, and its earlier status as a way station on Montauk Highway, originally the only through highway on Long Island's south shore, most of the core of Babylon dates to the era from before the American Civil War to World War I. As a result, there is a mix of building styles, including pre-Civil War, colonial, Victorian, and more recent designs. Nearer the shore, much of the housing was originally summer properties, including mansions and estates, cottages and bungalows: the latter two, virtually all now winterized.  As far as large formal mansions and estates, most have been razed, yet one of the last remaining estates in Babylon, and presumably the towns smallest is the Long Island Yacht Club, built by E.W. Howell Co. of Babylon, NY in 1927 at a cost of $26.500.00.

Areas of large old homes and less formal mansions exist in a number of areas, including on Fire Island Avenue, Crescent Avenue and Thompson Avenue on Sumpawam's Neck, the area in between West Creek (Carll's River) and East Creek (Sumpawams River), the main body of the village between Main Street and the Bay.

Because of this history, and the general unavailability of large tracts of building land, Babylon Village has very few tract houses or developments. Some of the few areas developed after World War II reflected the conversion of remaining farms and remains of large estates and mansions.  These areas generally contain 1950s-style ranch houses, but there are some characteristic Long Island split level homes and high ranches.

Areas of large new homes are on formerly undeveloped or reclaimed former wetlands developed during the late 1940s through 1970s, including on Lucinda and Peninsula Drives, with estate-like homes such as that of Bret Saberhagen until 2001. Most of the affluent homes built in these new areas were large ranch houses, popular in the time of building, but much less favored today. In the last decade and continuing to the present, many of these houses have been expanded by adding a story and changing their style to more colonial appearance.

Babylon Village has also experienced the modern phenomenon in which small sound houses on desirable lots have been purchased and torn down by affluent recent purchasers and replaced with houses as large as zoning will permit, meaning that the new home builder has paid the price of a home just to obtain the lot.

Houses of worship

 Bethel A.M.E. Church, 50 Cooper Street
 Christ Episcopal Church, 12 Prospect Street
 Congregation Beth Sholom, 441 Deer Park Avenue
 Cross of Christ Lutheran Church, 576 Deer Park Avenue
 Ebenezer Baptist Church, 33 Cooper Street
 First Presbyterian Church of Babylon, 79 East Main Street
 St. Nicholas' Greek Orthodox Church, 200 Great East Neck Road (West Babylon)
 St. Joseph's Roman Catholic Church, 40 Grove Place
 Seventh Day Adventist Church, 136 Fire Island Avenue
 United Methodist Church of Babylon, 21 James Street

Public schools

Most of the residents of the Village of Babylon are served by the Babylon Union Free School District (UFSD). Since the school district lines are not coextensive with the village boundaries, as is common on Long Island, some residents of Babylon Village are in the West Babylon UFSD and, conversely, some residents of West Babylon go to the village schools, as well as residents of Oak Island, Oak Beach, Gilgo, West Gilgo, and Captree Island across the Great South Bay.

As of the 2010-2011 School Year, the Babylon Union Free School District had 1,788 students. The racial demographics were 0% Native American or Alaska Native, 4% non-Hispanic black or African-American, 8% Hispanic or Latino, 84% non-Hispanic white, 3% Asian or Native Hawaiian/Other Pacific Islander and 0% multiracial. 9% of students were eligible for free lunch, 3% for reduced-price lunch, and 1% of students were Limited English Proficient. 10.7% of students were classified as "Special Ed".

The school district had a graduation rate of 94%, and 1% of students did not complete school. 96% of graduates received a Regents Diploma and 67% received a Regents Diploma with Advanced Designation. Of the 2011 completers, 75% planned to move on to 4-year College, 19% to 2-year College, 0% to Other Post-Secondary, 0% to the Military, 4% to Employment, 0% to Adult Services, 2% had other known post-secondary plans, and 0% had no known post-secondary plan.

The district currently has three schools:
 Babylon Elementary School, serves all students in grades K-2;
 Babylon Grade School, serves all students in grades 3-6. Both of these schools are on a single large campus running east from Ralph Avenue between Park Avenue and Beverly Road;
 Babylon Junior-Senior High School, serves grades 7 and up in the original, but modernized and expanded High School building on North Carll Avenue between South Railroad Avenue and Grove Place, opposite the Babylon Railroad Station.

Babylon Village children who live in the West Babylon School District (all of Babylon Village west of Route 109 and all of Little East Neck south of Cambridge Drive) are served by these schools:
 John F. Kennedy Elementary School or South Bay School, both on the same campus west of Great East Neck Road, grades K-5;
 West Babylon Junior High School, serves students in grades 6-8, located at Old Farmingdale Road and Little East Neck Road;
 West Babylon High School, serves students in grades 9-12, at the junction of Route 109 (Babylon-Farmingdale Road) and Great East Neck Road.

The poet Walt Whitman, forced to find work after the Great Fire of New York in 1835 devastated the printing and publishing industry, took work at a number of Long Island "country schools." Among them was West Babylon's school, located midway between Little East Neck and Great East Neck Roads, just west of the current village boundary, and now occupied by a supermarket, where he taught in the winter of 1836-37.West Babylon NY 11704

Geography

According to the United States Census Bureau, the village has a total area of 2.8 square miles (7.1 km2), of which 2.4 square miles (6.2 km2)  is land and 0.3 square miles (0.9 km2)  (12.32%) is water.

Babylon Village is bordered to the west by West Babylon, to the north by North Babylon, to the east by West Islip, and to the south by the Great South Bay.

Demographics

As of the census of 2010, there were 12,166 people and 4,585 households in the village, with 2.65 persons per household. The population density was 4,975.9 people per square mile (2,864.3/km2).

There were 4,768 housing units. 3.8% were vacant and 20.7% of occupied housing units were occupied by renters.

The racial makeup of the village was 91.9% White, 2.0% African American, 0.1% Native American, 2.2% Asian, 0.0% Pacific Islander, 1.8% from other races, and 2.0% from two or more races. Hispanic or Latino of any race were 6.7% of the population. The village was 87.6% non-Hispanic White.

There were 4,585 households, out of which 33.3% had children under the age of 18 living with them, 24.5% had individuals over the age of 65, 55.4% were married couples living together, 10.3% had a female householder with no husband present, and 30.1% were non-families. 23.7% of all households were made up of individuals, and 7.8% had someone living alone who was 65 years of age or older. The average household size was 2.64 and the average family size was 3.18.

In the village, the population was spread out, with 5.3% under the age of 5, 22.5% under the age of 18, 5.2% from 20 to 24, 25.7% from 25 to 44, 31.6% from 45 to 64, and 12.1% who were 65 years of age or older. The median age was 41.6 years.

The following data is from the Census' American Community Survey (from 2006-2010):
The homeownership rate was 78.2% and 15.3% of housing units were in multi-unit structures.
95.6% of the population had lived in the same house 1 year & over. 8.8% of the entire population were foreign born and 8.6% of residents at least 5 years old spoke a language other than English at home.
95.1% of residents at least 25 years old had graduated from high school, and 39.6% of residents at least 25 years old had a bachelor's degree or higher. The mean travel time to work for workers aged 16 and over was 31.4 minutes.
The median income for a household in the village was $127,407. The per capita income for the village was $44,293. According to the 2010 Census, 4.5% of the population were below the poverty line.

Transportation

Babylon is served by several transit options. The Babylon station is the terminal for the Babylon Branch of the Long Island Rail Road, and is also served by the Montauk Branch. Therefore, passengers utilizing the Babylon station can travel to both the westernmost and easternmost stations on Long Island, making the village ideal for commuters. The average weekday commute from Babylon station to New York City's Penn Station ranges (roughly) from 55 minutes to 1 hour 15 minutes, depending on train schedules and station stops. The train station is also a hub for many buses run by Suffolk County Transit, as well as a route run by Nassau Inter-County Express.
 S20: Sunrise Mall - Babylon
 S23: Walt Whitman Mall - Babylon via Wyandanch
 S25: West Babylon - Babylon
 S27: Hauppauge - Babylon
 S29: Walt Whitman Mall - Babylon via Deer Park Avenue
 S40: Patchogue - Babylon
 S42: Bay Shore - Babylon
 S47: Robert Moses State Park (Fire Island) - Babylon *Summer Service*

Health care
Babylon village is primarily served by Good Samaritan Hospital Medical Center in the nearby hamlet of West Islip, and by Southside Hospital in the nearby hamlet of Bay Shore.

Notable people

 Danielle Ammaccapane, professional golfer and NCAA women's champion.
 Tom Bohrer, won two Olympic rowing silver medals.
 Connie Carberg, first female NFL scout
 Rodney Dangerfield, comedian and actor.
 Billy Hayes, author of Midnight Express.
 Joseph Iannuzzi, Gambino crime family mob associate turned mob informant.
 Steve Janaszak, backup goaltender for the 1980 US Olympic ice hockey team.
 Bob Keeshan, television personality: Clarabell the clown; Captain Kangaroo.
 Guglielmo Marconi, inventor of wireless telegraphy.
 Ashley Massaro, former WWE Diva.
 Butterfly McQueen, film actress, best known from role in Gone with the Wind.
 Dan Meuser, US Representative from Pennsylvania
 Robert Moses, builder.
 Bret Saberhagen, professional baseball player, Cy Young Award-winning pitcher.
 Mike Scaccia, guitarist for metal bands Ministry, Rigor Mortis and The Revolting Cocks. 
 Mary Schapiro, in charge of U.S. Securities and Exchange Commission, graduated from Babylon Junior Senior High School.
 William Shepherd, former Navy SEAL and NASA astronaut; recipient of Congressional Space Medal of Honor.
 Chris Wingert, professional soccer player, currently playing for Real Salt Lake (MLS).

References

External links

 
 
 Babylon Village Chamber of Commerce
 Babylon Village Patch

Babylon (town), New York
Villages in New York (state)
African-American historic places
Villages in Suffolk County, New York
Populated coastal places in New York (state)